Arthur William Penny (3 December 1907 – 29 November 2003) was an English athlete who competed in the 1934 British Empire Games and won the gold medal in the 6-mile event (9.7 km).

External links
 Profile at TOPS in athletics
 Obituary at the website of the Belgrave Harriers

1907 births
2003 deaths
English male long-distance runners
Athletes (track and field) at the 1934 British Empire Games
Commonwealth Games gold medallists for England
Commonwealth Games medallists in athletics
Medallists at the 1934 British Empire Games